This is a list of the albums ranked number one in the Czech Republic in the 2020s. The top-performing albums and EPs in the Czech Republic are ranked on the Albums – Top 100, which is published by the IFPI Czech Republic. The data is based on sales (both at retail and digital), and online streaming on Spotify, Apple Music, Google Play and Deezer.

Chart history

Longest-running number-one albums 
The list features longest-running number-one albums, according to the amount of weeks they spend at number one in the decade.

Notes

References 

Czech Republic Albums
Czech Republic 2020
Albums